António Joaquim Caraça, known as Caraça (born 7 February 1932) is a former Portuguese football player.

He played 13 seasons and 272 games in the Primeira Liga for Lusitano Évora and Vitória de Guimarães.

Club career
He made his Primeira Liga debut for Vitória de Guimarães on 28 September 1952 in a game against Porto.

References

1932 births
Living people
Portuguese footballers
S.L. Benfica B players
Vitória S.C. players
Primeira Liga players
Lusitano G.C. players
Association football forwards